Crossing the Line may refer to:

Films 
 Crossing the Line, an alternate US title for the film The Big Man, by David Leland
 Crossing the Line, an alternate UK title for the film Little Woods, by Nia DaCosta
 Crossing the Line (2002 film), a 2002 film by Graeme Clifford
 Crossing the Line (2006 film), a 2006 documentary by Daniel Gordon
 Crossing the Line (2007 film), a 2007 documentary by Pietro Marcello
 Crossing the Line (2008 film), a 2008 short by Peter Jackson and the first film made with the Red One camera

Books 
 Crossing the Line (novel), a 2004 novel by Karen Traviss
 Crossing the Line: Sexual Assault in Canada’s National Sport, 1998 book by Laura Robinson

Events 
 Crossing the Line Festival, an annual fall arts festival held by French Institute Alliance Française in New York City
 Crossing the Line '99, a 1999 professional wrestling event.
"Crossing The Line", a song from season 3 of Rapunzel's Tangled Adventure

Terminology 
The phrase "crossing the line" may refer to:
 when a film or TV director breaks the 180-degree rule (by accident or design), during filmmaking
 a line-crossing ceremony in a ship voyage

See also
Crossing Lines